Randersvej Water Tower is a former water tower on Randersvej in Aarhus, Denmark. It is listed for preservation.

References 

1907 establishments in Denmark
Buildings and structures in Aarhus
Water towers in Denmark